The 1981 Pontins Professional was the eighth edition of the professional invitational snooker tournament which took place between 9 and 16 May 1981 in Prestatyn, Wales.

The tournament featured eight professional players. The quarter-final matches were contested over the best of 9 frames, the semi-final matches over the best of 9 frames, and the final over the best of 17 frames.

Terry Griffiths won the event for the first time, beating Willie Thorne 9–8 in the final.

Main draw

References

Pontins Professional
Snooker competitions in Wales
Pontins Professional
Pontins Professional
Pontins Professional